The Armstrong Committee, formally the Joint Committee of the Senate and Assembly of the State of New York to Investigate and Examine into the Business and Affairs of Life Insurance Companies Doing Business in the State of New York was an investigation begun in late 1905 when the New York State Legislature initiated an investigation of the life insurance companies operating in New York.

The Equitable Life Assurance Society of the United States had grown to be one of the largest insurance companies in the United States, with over $1 billion in assets around 1900. After continued elaborate activities by the executives at the company, allegations of corruption occurred.  The investigation by the New York Insurance Department began after an accumulation of complaints by consumers and other insurers, and was catalyzed by rumors that James Hazen Hyde, a vice president and expected next corporate president of The Equitable Life Assurance Society of the United States, had charged the expense of an immense costume ball that year to the corporate account. The investigation uncovered a series of corrupt practices used by the company. The report came to the conclusion that “A cancer can not be cured by treating the symptoms. Complete mutualization, to be paid for at a price only commensurate with its dividends is, in my opinion, the only sure measure of relief." 

The findings led to the creation of the Armstrong Commission to investigate such practices across the industry. Spearheaded by William Armstrong, a State Senator, the commission began work in 1905.

The Armstrong Committee eventually issued a report highlighting a number of questionable practices. The legislature in New York and several other states adopted many of the recommendations, including a restriction on policies with lengthy deferred payouts, including the 19th century version of tontines. The report also recommended a prohibition on political campaign contributions by such corporations. It is credited with launching the political career of Charles Evans Hughes. It conducted 51 investigatory sessions and its recommendations were incorporated into eight New York State statutes. Numerous other states soon followed suit.

Background 
A tontine is an investment plan for raising capital in which each subscriber pays an agreed sum into the fund, and thereafter receives an annuity. As members die, their shares devolve to the other participants, and so the value of each annuity increases. On the death of the last member, the scheme is wound up. After an initial introduction in 1868 in the United States, they soon grew in popularity, to the point that by 1905, two-thirds of the life insurance in the United States was in the form of tontines. Tontine insurance was first developed in the United States by Sheppard Homans, an actuary of The Equitable Life Assurance Society of the United States.

References

Sources

Further reading
 Testimony : taken before the Joint Committee of the Senate and Assembly of the State of New York to Investigate and Examine into the Business and Affairs of Life Insurance Companies Doing Business in the State of New York  Archive.org link

Financial regulation in the United States